Dudenevo is the name of several rural localities in Russia:
Dudenevo, Nizhny Novgorod Oblast, a selo in Dudenevsky Selsoviet of Bogorodsky District of Nizhny Novgorod Oblast
Dudenevo, Tver Oblast, a village in Kalininsky District of Tver Oblast
Dudenevo, Vladimir Oblast, a village in Alexandrovsky District of Vladimir Oblast
Dudenevo, Vologda Oblast, a village in Yurovsky Selsoviet of Gryazovetsky District of Vologda Oblast
Dudenevo, Yaroslavl Oblast, a village in Breytovsky Rural Okrug of Breytovsky District of Yaroslavl Oblast